The following list shows the recipients for the CMT Music Award for Video of the Year. Originally the Flameworthy Video of the Year award, which changed in 2005. This Award is entirely fan voted. The award was first awarded in 2002.

Recipients

References 

CMT Music Awards
Awards established in 2002
American music video awards